Sotiris Billis (born November 14, 1996) is a Greek professional basketball player and the vice-captain for Kolossos Rodou of the Greek Basket League. He is a 1.98 m (6 ft. 6in.) tall small forward.

Youth career
Billis played from a young age with the youth teams of Panionios, before he started his pro career.

Professional career
Billis signed his first professional contract with the Greek Basket League club Panionios, on 2014. After playing one season with Kolossos Rodou, he returned to Panionios for a second spell on July 28, 2016. He rejoined Kolossos the following year, where he stayed for two seasons. During the 2019–2020 season, Billis played with ASK Karditsas of the Greek A2 League. 

In 2020, Billis returned to Kolossos Rodou for the third time. On July 2, 2021, he renewed his contract with the island team for another year. In 16 games, he averaged 2.1 points and 1.2 rebounds, playing around 7 minutes per contest. On August 2, 2022, he re-signed for another season, his sixth overall with the club.

References

External links
Eurobasket.com Profile
Greek Basket League Profile 

1996 births
Living people
Greek men's basketball players
Greek Basket League players
Panionios B.C. players
Small forwards
Basketball players from Athens